Chernin Entertainment is an American film and television production company founded and owned by former News Corporation president and chief operating officer Peter Chernin, also CEO and chairman of the company. Jenno Topping is the current Head of Film and Television, with David Ready serving as EVP of Film and Television. Kristen Campo is the EVP of television. Twenty-four films have been produced by them, most of them with 20th Century Fox.

History 
Chernin Entertainment was founded by Peter Chernin after he stepped down as president of Fox's then-parent company News Corp. in 2009. The firm's first film was Rise of the Planet of the Apes in 2011. Chernin Entertainment's  five-year first-look deal for the film and television was signed with 20th Century Fox and 20th Century Fox Television in 2009.

In March 2011, after leaving Maguire Entertainment, Jenno Topping joined the company as executive Vice President (EVP) of film division, and then in February 2013 she was promoted to President of films, vacated by Dylan Clark. David Ready was hired as Senior VP to report to Topping. In June 2015, the company's TV division's president Katherine Pope left the company, while Topping was promoted to President of Film and Television. In August 2015, Dante Di Loreto was hired and appointed as President of Television at the company, reporting to Topping. Kristen Campo joined the company in 2016 to run television after Di Loreto's departure.

In November 2014, the company signed an extension of the first-look deal with 20th Century Fox for film at a less lucrative terms. With only one hit TV show, New Girl, the TV pact was being shopped around. In June 2015, Chernin signed its television production deal for two years with NBCUniversal, in which Chernin would develop and produce projects for NBC though Universal Television. That deal was followed with one with Endeavor Content for a scripted drama pact in 2017.

On January 17, 2020, 20th Century Studios, now under the operation of Walt Disney Studios, ended its production deal with Chernin Entertainment, which had about four years remaining. The move was cited to Disney's preference of self-financing its films, and the studio's mandate of having 20th Century refocus on its franchises. Chernin will continue to work with Disney and 20th Century on the Planet of the Apes franchise and about 9 other films with the studio, while taking 70 out of 80 films in development in the split. On April 7, Chernin made a multi-year first-look deal with Netflix to make films.

In September 2020, Chernin Entertainment inked a multi-year partnership agreement with Spotify to allow the former to adapt films and TV shows from Spotify's original podcast catalog. On October 27, 2021, Nancy Utley, former vetaran of Searchlight Pictures had started Lake Ellyn Entertainment, with a first-look affiliate deal at the studio, and Netflix.

Production 
Chernin Entertainment produces for television and film.

The company's first feature film Rise of the Planet of the Apes, was released in August 2011 and has grossed more than $480 million at the worldwide box office. It has also produced Parental Guidance, a comedy starring Billy Crystal and Bette Midler, which was released in December 2012, the sci-fi thriller from Joseph Kosinski, Oblivion, starring Tom Cruise, and The Heat, starring Melissa McCarthy and Sandra Bullock.

Filmography

Feature films

2010s

2020s

Upcoming

Television

2010s

2020s

References 

Film production companies of the United States
Television production companies of the United States
Companies based in Los Angeles
Mass media companies established in 2009
2009 establishments in California